The 2020 NCAA Division I Outdoor Track and Field Championships was scheduled to be the 99th NCAA Division I Men's Outdoor Track and Field Championships and the 39th NCAA Division I Women's Outdoor Track and Field Championships held at Mike A. Myers Stadium in Austin, Texas on the campus of the University of Texas at Austin. In total, forty-two different men's and women's track and field events were to be contested from Wednesday, June 10 to Saturday, June 13, 2020. On March 12, 2020, the event was cancelled by the NCAA due to the coronavirus pandemic.

See also
 NCAA Men's Division I Outdoor Track and Field Championships
 NCAA Women's Division I Outdoor Track and Field Championships

References

External links
 Results

NCAA Men's Outdoor Track and Field Championship
NCAA Women's Outdoor Track and Field Championship
NCAA Division I Outdoor Track and Field Championships
College sports in Texas
Sports competitions in Texas
Sports in Austin, Texas
NCAA Division I Outdoor Track and Field Championships
NCAA Division I Outdoor Track and Field Championships
NCAA Division I Outdoor Track and Field Championships